Raipur Daba also spelled as Raipur Dabba  is a village in Shaheed Bhagat Singh Nagar district of Punjab State, India. The village is administrated by Sarpanch an elected representative of the village.

Demography 
As of 2011, Raipur Daba has a total number of 288 houses and population of 1271 of which 631 include are males while 640 are females according to the report published by Census India in 2011. The literacy rate of Raipur Daba is 81.23% higher than the state average of 75.84%. The population of children under the age of 6 years is 104 which is 8.18% of total population of Raipur Daba, and child sex ratio is approximately 891 as compared to Punjab state average of 846.

Most of the people are from Schedule Caste which constitutes 51.85% of total population in Raipur Daba. The town does not have any Schedule Tribe population so far.

As per the report published by Census India in 2011, 343 people were engaged in work activities out of the total population of Raipur Daba which includes 318 males and 116 females. According to census survey report 2011, 97.70% workers describe their work as main work and 2.30% workers are involved in Marginal activity providing livelihood for less than 6 months.

Education 
The village has a Punjabi medium, co-ed upper primary school established in 1974. The school provide mid-day meal which prepared in school premisesas per Indian Midday Meal Scheme. As per Right of Children to Free and Compulsory Education Act the school provide free education to children between the ages of 6 and 14.

Amardeep Singh Shergill Memorial college Mukandpur, KC Engineering College and Doaba Khalsa Trust Group Of Institutions are the nearest colleges.

List of schools nearby:
Govt Senior Secondary School, Ladhana Jhikka
Dashmesh Model School, Kahma
Govt High School, Jhander Kalan
Govt Gigh School, Khan Khana
Guru Ram Dass Public School, Cheta

Transport 

Fair and festivals 
The village has a Sikh shrine where a religious fair held annually, which attended by a large number of people of all religions.

Notable people 
Bhai Rattan Singh (Raipur Dabba) was a leader of The Ghadar Party was born in Raipur Dabba in 1879.

See also 
List of villages in India

References

External links 
 Tourism of Punjab
 Census of Punjab
 Locality Based PINCode

Villages in Shaheed Bhagat Singh Nagar district